Danverse Neff (21 May 1834, in New Lisbon, New York – 6 September 1898) was a member of the Wisconsin State Assembly.

Political career
Neff was a member of the Assembly during the 1876 session. Additionally, he chaired the board of Willow Springs, Wisconsin and was a postmaster and a justice of the peace. He was a Republican.

References

1834 births
1898 deaths
People from Otsego County, New York
People from Willow Springs, Wisconsin
Businesspeople from Wisconsin
Mayors of places in Wisconsin
Wisconsin postmasters
American justices of the peace
American merchants
19th-century American politicians
19th-century American businesspeople
19th-century American judges
Republican Party members of the Wisconsin State Assembly